Grampa in Oz (1924) is the eighteenth in the series of Oz books created by L. Frank Baum and his successors, and the fourth written by Ruth Plumly Thompson.

Plot

Things are going from bad to worse in the dilapidated kingdom of Ragbad; even the rag crop is failing. To top it all off (or not), King Fumbo's head is blown away in a ferocious storm (with "ten thousand pounds of thunder"). Prince Tatters of Ragbad, and Grampa, a former soldier and the bravest man in the kingdom (population 27), set out on a three-fold quest: for King Fumbo's lost head, a fortune to save the bankrupt kingdom, and a princess for Tatters to marry. They are joined by Bill, an iron weathercock from Chicago, who was brought to life by an electrical storm and blown to Oz.

Meanwhile, in Perhaps City in the Maybe Mountains, the Princess Pretty Good has a problem: the prophet Abrog (also known as Gorba) foresees her marrying a monster if she does not marry in four days. (He suggests himself as her bridegroom.) When Pretty Good resists, Abrog kidnaps her and tries to transform her into a clod of earth; but since she is, in fact, more than just pretty good, as princesses go, Pretty Good turns into the beautiful flower fairy Urtha.

Wide-ranging adventures—from Fire Island to Isa Poso to Monday Mountain — culminate in the location and restoration of King Fumbo's head. Dorothy (with the help of Percy Vere the forgetful poet) manages to restore order. Prince Tatters ends up married to Princess Pretty Good — which is pretty good for him.

References

External links
 
 A detailed discussion of Grampa in Oz among Oz fans at Pumperdink.org
 Review/discussion of Grampa in Oz at Tor.com

Oz (franchise) books
1924 American novels
1924 fantasy novels
1924 children's books